The  was a Byzantine office, whose holder was responsible for receiving and answering petitions to the Byzantine emperor and other Byzantine officials.

The office is usually considered by modern scholars, such as J. B. Bury, as the direct continuation of the late Roman , but this identification is not certain. The title is first attested in a 7th-century seal. In the lists of precedence like the Kletorologion of 899, he was counted among the judicial officials. From the latter half of the 11th century however and during the 12th, the office rose much in importance, with its holders receiving higher titles and being drawn from among the Empire's most senior noble families. The last named holder, George Chatzikes, is attested in 1321, but the office is still mentioned as active decades later by Pseudo-Kodinos.

It is unknown if he had a dedicated staff, or what its composition may have been; it is absent in the Kletorologion, but a seal of a probably subordinate "notary of the petitions" is known.

Seals also attest to the existence of provincial officials titled , among others in Sicily and the Peloponnese, as well as for the Patriarch of Constantinople.

References

Sources 
 
 
 
 

Byzantine judicial offices
Greek words and phrases